Thomas Lamb Farm, also known as "Brick House Farm", is a historic home located at Kenton, Kent County, Delaware.  The house dates to the second quarter
of the 18th-century, and is a two-story, three-bay, single pile brick dwelling. It has a hall-and-parlor plan. Attached is a -story, three-bay brick kitchen wing with a porch.

It was listed on the National Register of Historic Places in 1983.

References

Houses on the National Register of Historic Places in Delaware
Houses in Kent County, Delaware
Kenton, Delaware
National Register of Historic Places in Kent County, Delaware